is a radio station in Tokyo, Japan, the flagship radio station of the Japan Radio Network (JRN). The company was founded by Tokyo Broadcasting System (TBS, presently named Tokyo Broadcasting System Holdings, Inc.) on March 21, 2000. TBS Radio started broadcasting on October 1, 2001.

External links
TBS Radio

Radio
Mass media companies based in Tokyo
Radio in Japan
Radio stations established in 1951
1951 establishments in Japan